Mansfield University of Pennsylvania is a campus of Commonwealth University of Pennsylvania and it is located it in Mansfield, Pennsylvania. Part of the Pennsylvania State System of Higher Education (PASSHE), the campus' total enrollment is 1,637 students.

History

Mansfield University traces its heritage back to 1857, when Mansfield Classical Seminary opened on January 7. At 10 a.m. on April 22, with a foot of snow on the ground, the Mansfield Classical Seminary burned to the ground. Immediately after the fire, the founders vowed to persevere and reconstruct an even bigger and better building. Mansfield Classical Seminary was rebuilt and reopened on November 23, 1859, to some 30 students. Rev. James Landreth was elected Principal and Miss Julia A. Hosmer was named preceptress.

In 1862, Simon B. Elliott submitted application for Mansfield Classical Seminary to become a state normal school. The application was accepted in December 1862, and Mansfield Classical Seminary became the Mansfield Normal School, the third state normal school in Pennsylvania. In 1874, the new ladies dormitory was built for a cost of $15,000. It would later be renamed North Hall.

In 1892 at the Great Mansfield Fair, electric lights were erected and a game of football was played between Mansfield Normal and Wyoming Seminary, ending in a draw. It is later recorded as the first night football game played in the United States.

In 1902, Mansfield Normal School moved to a three-year program from the two-year normal course, pushing the school closer to collegiate status. On June 4, 1926, Mansfield State Normal School was granted the right to give four-year Collegiate degrees. Finally, on May 13, 1927, the name Mansfield Normal is officially changed to Mansfield State Teachers College (MSTC).

During World War II, several hundred male students entered military service, and nurse training was initiated at MSTC. Most of the sports are suspended at the college for the duration of the war. Post-war, sports resumed with MSTC capturing two consecutive State Championships in football for the 1946 and 1947 seasons. During the 1950s, both South Hall and Alumni Hall were replaced with new buildings.

In 1960, the Pennsylvania Department of Education granted the expansion of liberal arts programs to colleges in the system, including MSTC. MSTC became Mansfield State College.  The campus continued to expand with the construction of other new buildings and new academic programs through the 1960s and 1970s.

In July 2021, Pennsylvania higher education officials announced that Mansfield would merge with Bloomsburg University and Lock Haven University in response to financial difficulties and declining enrollment, and each institution would represent a campus of a single university. In March 2022, the new institution was created to oversee the three campuses and was named the Commonwealth University of Pennsylvania.

Campus

On its  campus, Mansfield has four residence halls, multiple eateries, an on-campus student health clinic, campus police unit, campus bookstore, an on-campus and student-led television studio, radio station, and campus newspaper, state-of-the-art North Hall Library, Grant Science Planetarium, Decker Gymnasium and Olympic-sized swimming pool, Kelchner Fitness Center, multiple outdoor recreation spots (ropes course, disc golf, and biking trails), Straughn Hall Auditorium, Steadman Theatre and Steadman Studios, Alumni Student Center and Game Room, Childcare Center (affiliate), in addition to several academic and administrative buildings and outdoor seating and learning venues.

North Hall Library

North Hall, a four-story Victorian structure, was completed in 1878.
The current visible North Hall was actually built in two parts.  The original North Hall from 1874 was torn down in the spring of 1907.  The north part (left side) and the middle section was started in the summer 1891 immediately following the purchase of the lot that the North end cross wing sits on. This new structure was seven stories tall. The new cafeteria on the first floor was opened for use on Thanksgiving Day 1892.  Until 1907 the original North Hall minus the northernmost cross wing part was up against the newer middle section (south side) and was only 4 stories tall.   In mid 1907 the matching South end of the current North Hall was started. This was completed in 1909. For years, the upper floors served as a women's dormitory while the ground floor was used as the cafeteria. As the university grew and other buildings on the campus were built, North Hall severely deteriorated.

The building was closed in 1976, and the building was almost demolished. But pressure from campus and community leaders salvaged North Hall. $11 million was used to restore the building through state and private funding. In 1996 North Hall reopened as a library, providing state-of-the-art technology.

The first floor of the library comprises several private listening rooms, complete with a variety of audio equipment and a theatre-viewing room with 25 seats. The first floor also holds the Music Library, the library's collection of media, and the Education Library. The second floor hosts the Reference Collection, the Best-Seller Collection, Circulation Desk, Reception Room, and covered porches with over-stuffed wicker furniture.

The third floor hosts the Periodical Collection and The Microfilm Room and Newspaper Reading Room. The fourth floor features private study rooms. The book stacks are located on the third and fourth floor. The library houses an abundance of desks, seating, and technology throughout.

Academics
Mansfield University offers 87 major and minor programs.  The university offers associate's, bachelor's, and master's degree programs. The university is accredited by the Middle States Commission on Higher Education.

Athletics
The Mansfield University Mountaineers intercollegiate athletics are members of the National Collegiate Athletic Association (NCAA) Division II and compete in the Pennsylvania State Athletic Conference (PSAC). The sprint football team competes in the Collegiate Sprint Football League.

Women's varsity programs include soccer, field hockey, basketball, cross-country, softball, indoor track, and track and field.  Men's programs include cross country, basketball, baseball, indoor track, track and field, and sprint football.

Notable alumni

Politicians
William D.B. Ainey (1864–1932) U.S. Congressman from Pennsylvania (1911–1915)
Chee Soon Juan, Singaporean opposition politician
Edwin J. Jorden (1863–1903) U.S. Congressman from Pennsylvania (1895)
Kenneth B. Lee (1922-2010), former Speaker of the Pennsylvania House of Representatives
Fred Churchill Leonard (1856–1921) U.S. Congressman from Pennsylvania (1895–1897)
William A. Stone (1846–1920), Pennsylvania Governor (1899–1903)

Sports
Tom Brookens, former Major League Baseball player
Mike Gazella, former Major League Baseball player
Hughie Jennings, former Major League Baseball player
Assaf Lowengart (born 1998), baseball player on Team Israel
Joe Shaute, former Major League Baseball player
Al Todd, former Major League Baseball player

Various
Wyatt McLaughlin, guitarist and founder of The Last Ten Seconds of Life
Ali Soufan, author, anti-terror FBI agent
Georgia Beers, author, Lambda Literary Award winner
Fabrisia Ambrosio, physical therapist and researcher

Notable faculty
 George S. Howard, music 1937–1940

References

External links

Mansfield Athletics website

 
Educational institutions established in 1857
Universities and colleges in Tioga County, Pennsylvania
1857 establishments in Pennsylvania
Public universities and colleges in Pennsylvania
Public liberal arts colleges in the United States